

Blandings Castle

The following 10 short stories feature Blandings Castle, its owner Lord Emsworth or members of his family. There are also 11 Blandings novels including an unfinished novel.

The short story "Life with Freddie" is not set in Blandings Castle but contains Lord Emsworth's son, Freddie Threepwood. "The Crime Wave at Blandings" was rewritten from an earlier non-Blandings story.

Drones Club 

There are 21 short stories in the Drones Club series, many of which star either Bingo Little or Freddie Widgeon. Most of the stories are told at the club amongst the members, who are referred to as Eggs, Beans and Crumpets. The stories are generally told by a Crumpet to an Egg or Bean, though four of the stories have no identified narrator: "The Fat of the Land", "Leave it to Algy", "Bingo Bans the Bomb", and "Stylish Stouts".

The US magazine version of "The Masked Troubadour" is a rewritten version titled "Reggie and the Greasy Bird". "Oofy, Freddie and the Beef Trust" was first published (as "Freddie, Oofy and the Beef Trust") in the 1949 omnibus The Best of Wodehouse.

Golf stories

Featuring 31 short stories, most narrated by a golf club's Oldest Member, usually from his seat on the terrace overlooking part of the golf course. One of the golf stories, "Those in Peril on the Tee", is also a Mr Mulliner story.

The UK magazine version of "Archibald's Benefit" is a cricket story titled "Reginald's Record Knock". "Rodney Has a Relapse" was first published (as "Rupert Has a Relapse") in the Canadian magazine National Home Monthly in 1949.

Jeeves
The following 35 short stories feature Drones Club member Bertie Wooster and his valet, Jeeves. There are also 11 Jeeves novels. Fourteen of the chapters in The Inimitable Jeeves were derived by splitting seven previously-published short stories.

Four of the stories in Carry On, Jeeves (1925) are slightly revised versions of Jeeves stories originally published in the UK-only collection My Man Jeeves (1919). "Fixing it for Freddie" and "Jeeves Makes an Omelette" are rewritten versions of Reggie Pepper stories published in My Man Jeeves.

Mr Mulliner

The following 40 short stories are narrated by raconteur Mr Mulliner, a fisherman who tells all the stories at a pub called the Angler's Rest. One of the stories, "Those in Peril on the Tee", is also a golf story. "George and Alfred" was rewritten from an earlier Reggie Pepper story. Multiple stories in this list were originally not told by Mr Mulliner in their magazine versions, but were revised to have a Mr Mulliner frame when published in a short story collection.

School stories

The following list includes 37 school stories written by Wodehouse. Most of the stories were not published in US periodicals. The fictional school at which each story takes place is noted. Some stories seem to have been rewritten with a different location for later republication. Several of Wodehouse's early novels are also set at schools, and multiple characters in the short stories also appear in one or two of the novels. The Pothunters is set at St Austin's, A Prefect's Uncle at Beckford, The Gold Bat and The White Feather at Wrykyn, The Head of Kay's at Eckleton, and Mike at Wrykyn and Sedleigh.

Each of the stories was published either in Tales of St. Austin's (1903) or later in the book Tales of Wrykyn and Elsewhere (1997). Some of the short stories in Tales of Wrykyn and Elsewhere had previously been published in The Uncollected Wodehouse (US, 1976), The Swoop! and Other Stories (US, 1979), or Plum Stones (UK, 1993).

Ukridge
In addition to the following 19 short stories, Stanley Featherstonehaugh Ukridge also appears in a single full-length novel, Love Among the Chickens (1906).

Miscellaneous stories
The following is a list of short stories by Wodehouse that are not part of one of the main series but were published in a collection of short stories by Wodehouse. Several of these stories were to some extent rewritten from or into other Wodehouse stories, as noted in the list. Wodehouse also wrote other stories that were only published in magazines.

Some of the books listed below, such as The Man Upstairs and A Man of Means, were originally only published in the UK, while others such as The Uncollected Wodehouse and The Eighteen-Carat Kid and Other Stories were originally only published in the US. Some stories were published in more than one of these collections. The stories are listed below with the first short story collection they were published in.

The six stories collected in A Man of Means were written in collaboration by Wodehouse and C. H. Bovill.

References

 Sources consulted 

  – Contains a bibliography of short stories issued in collections published before 1974
  – Chronological list, with first publications
  – Contains information about short story collections published before 1990, and a list of the short stories grouped by the periodical in which they were published
  – Alphabetical list, with first publications and appearances in collections
  – Categorised list, with main series

External links 
 
 
 
 
 

 
Bibliographies by writer
Bibliographies of British writers
Lists of stories